is a Japanese voice actress and professional wrestler. She has a career as a singer, signed to Lantis. She has released 14 singles (including joint and character singles) and four albums. She covered Yumi Matsutoya's "Toki o Kakeru Shōjo" as the B-side of her first single "Angel Fish" in 2003. She is known to have a close relationship with Mai Nakahara, having collaborated in eight anime where most of the characters they voiced in together had close connections: DearS, Kage Kara Mamoru!, My-HiME, My-Otome, Please Twins!, Sola, Strawberry Panic! and the Lucky Star drama CD. Shimizu has worked sporadic professional wrestling matches since December 2013.

Voice roles

Anime television series

2001
Parappa The Rapper, Baby Miran
Mahoromatic, Minawa Andou

2002
Heat Guy J, Monica Gabriel
Mahoromatic:Something More Beautiful, Minawa Andou
Rizelmine, Kurumi
Shrine of the Morning Mist, Yuzu Hieda

2003
Croket!, Drop
Mahoromatic:Summer Special, Minawa Andou
Nurse Witch Komugi, Posokichi
Please Twins!, Karen Onodera
Raimuiro Senkitan, Momen Sanada, Theme Song Performance
Wandaba Style, Kiku No. 8
Yami to Bōshi to Hon no Tabibito, Hatsumi Azuma, Kogechibi

2004
DearS, Ren
Girls Bravo, Hakana
Magical Girl Lyrical Nanoha, Suzuka Tsukimura
My-HiME, Mikoto Minagi
This Ugly Yet Beautiful World, Akari
W Wish, Senna Tōno

2005
Absolute Boy, Shione Unno
Zettai Seigi Love Pheromone, Aimi Yoshizumi
Fushigiboshi no Futagohime, Puppet
He Is My Master, Mitsuki Sawatari
Hell Girl, Ryōko Takamura
Magical Girl Lyrical Nanoha A's, Suzuka Tsukimura
MÄR,  Snow, Koyuki
My-Otome, Mikoto Minagi
Oku-sama wa Mahō Shōjo: Bewitched Agnes, Sayaka Kurenai

2006
D.Gray-man, Road Kamelot
Gift: Under the Rainbow, Riko Fukamine
High School Girls, Momoka Suzuki
Kage Kara Mamoru!, Yamame Hattori
Kagihime Monogatari Eikyū Alice Rondo, Arisu Arisugawa
Mamoru-kun ni Megami no Shukufuku o!, Itsumi Yoshimura
Rakugo Tennyo Oyui, Suzu Koishikawa
Shinigami no Ballad, Daniel
Strawberry Panic!, Tamao Suzumi, Kizuna Hyūga

2007
Ayakashi, Pam Werne Asakura
El Cazador de la Bruja,  Ellis
Kenkō Zenrakei Suieibu Umishō, Maki Ikuta
Princess Resurrection, Sherwood
Sola, Koyori Ishizuki

2008
Akiba-chan, Akiba-chan
Hatenkō Yūgi, Lalawell (ep 5–6)
Kyōran Kazoku Nikki, Tsubaki Ryuukotsuji (ep 7)
Zettai Karen Children, Hatsune Inugami

2009
Fight Ippatsu! Jūden-chan!!, Kuran Shunt
Mahoromatic: Tadaima Okaeri, Minawa Andou
Saki, Hajime Kunihiro
Seitokai no Ichizon, Elise Toudou
Tears to Tiara, Ermin

2010
Jewelpet Twinkle☆, Sango
The Qwaser of Stigmata, Elizabeth (Lizzie)

2011
Horizon in the Middle of Nowhere, Mitsuki Sanyou
Hoshizora e Kakaru Hashi, Madoka Komoto
Kore wa Zombie Desu ka?, Ariel/Dai-sensei
Jewelpet Sunshine, Sango, Kaede Kikuchi
The Qwaser of Stigmata II, Elizabeth (Lizzie)

2012
Kore wa Zombie Desu ka? of the Dead, Ariel/Dai-sensei

2013
High School DxD New, Serafall Leviathan
Kami Nomi zo Shiru Sekai, Akari Kurakawa/Rimyuel

2014
The Kawai Complex Guide to Manors and Hostel Behavior, Chinatsu
The Fruit of the Grisaia, Sachi Komine

2015
High School DxD BorN, Serafall Leviathan

2016
Aokana: Four Rhythm Across the Blue, Minamo Shirase

Original video animations 
Cosplay Complex (2002), Athena Imai
Generation of Chaos III ~Seal of Time~ (2003), Teefa
Please Twins!: The Summer Never Ends (2004), Karen Onodera
Psychic Academy (2002 ONA), Kyaru
Raimuiro Senkitan: The South Island Dream Romantic Adventure (2004), Momen Sanada, Theme Song Performance
Rune Factory Oceans, Sonia
Strawberry 100% (2005), Chinami Hashimoto

Video games
January 2005: Otome wa Boku ni Koishiteru: Futari no Elder, Yū Kashiwagi
May 2005: Gift: prism, Riko Fukamine
March 2008: 12Riven, Chisato Inose
September 2009: Tears to Tiara: Kakan no Daichi, Ermin
March 2010: Amatu Misora ni!: Kumo no Hatate ni, Miyu Kanzaki
February 2011: Grisaia no Kajitsu, Sachi Komine
February 2012: Hatsuyuki Sakura, Sakura Tamaki
March 2012: Let's Fish! Hooked On, herself
March 2012: Root Double: Before Crime * After Days, Subject N
June 2015: Fire Emblem if, Charlotte
March 2016: NightCry, Connie
May 2017: Fire Emblem Heroes, Charlotte

Drama CDs 
Junk Force, Mill
Walkure Romanze: Shōjo Kishi Monogatari, Mio Kisaki

Singles and albums

Singles
 (May 22, 2002, Lantis)
 (November 27, 2003, Lantis) with Mai Nakahara, ranked 51st in Oricon charts
"Parade" (July 22, 2004, Lantis) with Mai Nakahara & Saeko Chiba, ranked 188th in Oricon charts
 (September 23, 2004, Lantis)
 (November 25, 2004, Lantis) ranked 128th in Oricon charts
 (February 24, 2005, Lantis) ranked 129th in Oricon charts
 (February 22, 2006, Lantis) ranked 64th in Oricon charts
 (Mai 26, 2006, Lantis) ranked 42nd in Oricon charts
 (August 23, 2006, Lantis) ranked 43rd in Oricon charts
 (April 25, 2007, Lantis) ranked 107th in Oricon charts
 (December 21, 2007, Lantis) ranked 136th in Oricon charts
 (March 26, 2008, Lantis) ranked 159th in Oricon charts
"Chimeric voice" (September 9, 2009, Lantis)
 (July 22, 2010, Lantis)

Albums
 (April 27, 2005, Lantis) ranked 115th in Oricon charts
 (August 24, 2005, Lantis)
Chronicle (December 21, 2006, Lantis) with Mai Nakahara, ranked 101st in Oricon charts
Nuova Storia (September 10, 2008, Lantis) ranked 141st in Oricon charts

Championships and accomplishments
Ice Ribbon
Triangle Ribbon Championship (1 time)

References

External links

Ai Shimizu at Haikyou 
Ai Shimizu at Lantis 
Ai Shimizu at Animate 

1981 births
Voice actresses from Tokyo
Japanese women pop singers
Japanese female professional wrestlers
Japanese video game actresses
Japanese voice actresses
Living people
Singers from Tokyo
Sportspeople from Tokyo
21st-century Japanese actresses
21st-century Japanese women singers
21st-century Japanese singers
81 Produce voice actors